Joseph N. Sanberg (born July 12, 1979) is an American entrepreneur. He is co-founder of Aspiration, Inc., an online banking and investing firm, and an early investor in meal delivery service Blue Apron. He is also the founder of CalEITC4Me, a California outreach program that helps low-income families claim the state and federal earned income tax credits.

Life 
Born and raised in Southern California, Sanberg went to Anaheim's Servite High School and studied at Harvard University. 

Sanberg lives in Los Angeles with his fiancée Nicole Lapin, an author and former CNBC anchor. In 2021, they publicly discussed experiencing a miscarriage in an effort to encourage companies to offer paid early pregnancy loss leave.

Career
Sanberg has described that, after college, he went to work on Wall Street and earned enough to feel monetarily secure. However, he has said he was uneasy working in an industry that he said “totally divorced service from profit,” and shifted to investing in start-ups, including the meal delivery outfit Blue Apron and Aspiration.com.

Sanberg co-founded Aspiration, Inc., an online financial company, with Andrei Cherny in 2013. Aspiration enables customers to choose their own fee levels on checking and investment accounts, and offers managed funds that are 100% fossil-fuel free. Sanberg is a founding investor in Blue Apron, a home meal delivery service and IVY.com, a "social university".

Sanberg serves on the Board of Governors at the Jefferson Awards Foundation, an organization that engages over a million youth in volunteer programs and public service annually.

Sanberg was called "the spark" for his leadership in 2015 toward California launching an Earned Income Tax Credit (EITC).  To support the California EITC, he founded a statewide outreach program called CalEITC4Me that is administered by Golden State Opportunity Foundation, which conducts research, analysis, public information and education programs with the aim of creating economic security for Californians. CalEITC4Me helps working families claim the state and federal earned income tax credits (EITC) and helps families get free tax preparation services.

Political speculation
It was reported in 2018 that Sanberg was considering a run for president in 2020 on an anti-poverty platform. Sanberg stated that he would support whoever the Democratic nominee is if he did not run. Sanberg began traveling to Ohio in April 2019 to test the possibility of a presidential run. Ultimately, on June 1, 2019, at the California Democrats State Convention, Sanberg announced that he would not campaign for the presidency.

With the possibility rising of a 2021 recall election to remove Governor Gavin Newsom, Sanberg attacked the recall as "anti-democratic" but prompted speculation that he might run in such an election.

Sanberg is leading an initiative in the 2022 California elections to raise the minimum wage to $18/hour, and organizers have purportedly received more than 1 million signatures. Sanberg has said that the idea is "wildly popular," with over 60% support.

References

External links

1979 births
21st-century American businesspeople
American investors
Businesspeople from Los Angeles
California Democrats
Harvard University alumni
Living people